The music of Cutie Honey spans many soundtracks, including Cutey Honey: TV Original B.G.M. Collection and New Super Android Cutey Honey: Music Collection Vol. 1 by Columbia Records, and Koda Kumi's  Love & Honey by Avex Group under the Rhythm Zone label.

Cutey Honey: TV Original B.G.M. Collection 

, or simply Cutey Honey: BGM Collection, is the soundtrack to the original 1973 Cutie Honey anime. The soundtrack was released on vinyl (product number CX-7054) by Columbia Records on May 21, 1982. Columbia would re-release the soundtrack on compact disc several times: on February 1, 1990 (CC-4586), on June 21, 1995 (COCC-12683), on November 28, 2000, and on September 25, 2003 (COCC-72028) as the 28th installment of the first volume of the ANIMEX 1200 series.

This album includes compositions by the show's composer . The closing theme was also performed by her as well. Like a lot of soundtracks released at that time, the music scores in this release are abridged in order to meet the then standard limit of tracks.

New Super Android Cutey Honey: Music Collection Vol. 1 

 is the licensed soundtrack to New Cutie Honey, the first Cutie Honey original video animation (OVA). It was released in Japan on February 21, 1994 (COCC-11513) by Nippon Columbia Co. Ltd. (now Columbia Music Entertainment). It would be reissued on CD-R (COR-11513) by Columbia's on-demand subsidiary R-Ban on October 21, 2001, and on March 21, 2007 (COCC-72247) as the 167th release of volume six of the Animex 1200 series.

This album features compositions by Kazuhiko Toyama, dramas (DJs) and commercial spots (CMs) with Honey's voice actor Michiko Neya, and two songs by Les 5-4-3-2-1: their rock version of the Cutie Honey opening theme used in the first four episodes, and the closing theme "Circle Game" heard in the first two.

Music Collection Vol. 1 is one of four New Cutie Honey soundtracks; a second and third Music Collection were also released, along with a Vocal Collection.

"Love & Honey" 

On May 26, 2004, Kumi Koda released the single "Love & Honey" which includes her cover of the main theme "Cutie Honey" as well as several other songs written for the film Cutie Honey and the OVA Re:Cutie Honey.

References

External links 
 

Anime soundtracks
Music of Cutie Honey
Koda Kumi songs
1973 soundtrack albums
1995 soundtrack albums
1982 soundtrack albums
2001 soundtrack albums
1994 soundtrack albums
Columbia Records soundtracks